Twenty Twenty is a British television production company that joined the Shed Media Group (now Warner Bros. Television Productions UK) in September 2007. The company produces documentaries, current affairs, drama, living history, and children's television.

Programming

Current productions
 First Dates (Channel 4)
 The Choir (BBC Two)
 Remotely Funny (CBBC)

Previous productions
 2018
 The Big Audition (ITV1)
 2015
 The Naked Choir (BBC Two)
 2012
 The Hoarder Next Door (Channel 4)
 2011
 Ben 10: Ultimate Challenge (Cartoon Network UK)
 2008
 The World's Strictest Parents (BBC Three)
 2007
 The Sorcerer's Apprentice (CBBC)
 Grandad's Back in Business (BBC Two)
 Never Did Me Any Harm (Channel 4)

 2006
 Evacuation (CBBC)
 Family Brat Camp (Channel 4)
 Bad Lads Army: Extreme (ITV1)
 How To Divorce Without Screwing Up Your Children (Channel 4)
 How to Beat Your Kid's Asthma (Channel 4)

 2005
 Bad Lads' Army: Officer Class (ITV1)
 Brat Camp (Channel 4 and ABC)
 That'll Teach 'Em Series 3 (Channel 4)
 Wakey Wakey Campers (Channel 4)
 I Know What You Ate Last Summer (Five)

2004
 Bad Lads' Army (ITV1)
 That'll Teach 'Em Series 2 (Channel 4)

2003
 That'll Teach 'Em (Channel 4)

2002
 Lads' Army (ITV1)

Current affairs

 What's the Story? with Vanessa Collingridge (2005, Five)
 First on Five (2005, Five)
 The Guantanamo Guidebook (2004, Channel 4)
 The Big Story with Dermot Murnaghan (1993, ITV1)

Twenty Twenty has produced the following programmes for Dispatches, Channel 4's long-running documentary series:

 Supermarket Secrets
 MMR – What They Didn't Tell You
 David Kelly – Death of a Scientist
 Bosses in the Dock
 Who Vets the Vets
 Don't Trust Me, I'm a Doctor

Documentaries

Documentaries produced by Twenty Twenty include:

 2007
 Meet the Foxes (Channel 4)
 Child Chain Smoker (Channel 4)

 2005
 Sex Crime Investigators (Channel 4)
 Inside the Brotherhood (Channel 4)
 Dyslexia (Channel 4)
 The Coroner (Channel 4)
 UN Blues (Channel 4)
 Stories from an African Hospital (Channel 4)
 Cutting Edge: Love Hurts (Channel 4)
 Island of Outcasts (Channel 4)
 The Turkish Connection (Channel 4)
 The Other Band of Brothers (Channel 4)
 Bitter Sweet (Channel 4)
 Navy Blues (Channel 4)

 2004
 The Child Who is Older Than Her Grandmother (Five)

 2003
 Sleeping with the Au-Pair (Channel 4)

 2002
 Secrets of the Dead: Blood on the Altar (Channel 4)

 2001
 Equinox: The Science of Trainers (Channel 4)
 Blinded (Channel 4)
 The Real: Erich Von Daniken (Channel 4)
 The Joy of Sex (Channel 4)
 Witness: Convent Girls (Channel 4)

 2000
 Hellraisers (Channel 4)
 Secret History: Funny Money (Channel 4)
 Cutting Edge: The Poker Club (Channel 4)
 The Singapore Mutiny 1915 (Channel 4)
 Poisoned (Channel 4)
 The Real: Keith Moon (Channel 4)
 Abducted'' (Channel 4)

References

External links 

Warner Bros.
Television production companies of the United Kingdom